Mobile Passport is a mobile app that enables US and Canadian passport holders entering the United States to submit their passport information and customs declaration form to U.S. Customs and Border Protection (CBP) via smartphone or tablet and go through the inspections process using an expedited lane. Mobile Passport is available to U.S. passport holders and Canadian passport holders when entering the United States. 
The app is available on iOS and Android devices and is operational at 29 airports and 4 seaports.
The use of Mobile Passport operations have increased threefold from 2016 to 2017.

History 
The Mobile Passport app was developed by Airside Mobile, Inc, an organization started by former executives at the Transportation Security Administration (TSA), Hans Miller and Adam Tsao.

Mobile Passport operations were launched in Atlanta at the Hartsfield-Jackson International Airport in 2016 and are now available at 24 U.S. airports and 1 U.S. cruise port. The Mobile Passport app is authorized by CBP and sponsored by the Airports Council International-North America, Boeing, and the Port of Everglades.
Airside Mobile, Inc. secured a Series A funding of $6M in the fall of 2017.

How it works 
During the customs process at the Federal Inspection Service (FIS) area of a U.S. airport, travelers arriving from international locations typically wait in long lines before presenting passports and paperwork and verbally answering questions made by CBP officials. U.S. passport holders and Canadian passport holders who have downloaded the Mobile Passport app can expedite this process by submitting information regarding their passport and trip details via their mobile device to CBP officials, then access an expedited line.
The Mobile Passport app can be downloaded from the Apple App Store or Google Play Store on to an iOS or Android device and complete their digital passport profile(s) before they travel. A pre-approval is not required and the app is for free. 
To set up a digital passport profile, travelers may use the document scanner feature within the Mobile Passport app to capture their passport information, and then verify that it is correct. Or, they may manually enter the information directly on the app. The name must appear exactly as it does on the passport. For instance, under Surname, users have to enter their last name. Under Given Names, travelers have to enter their first name [SPACE] middle name [SPACE] middle name, and so on. All hyphens and apostrophes should be replaced by a [SPACE]. To complete the passport profile, users have to touch the box at the bottom of the screen. The camera on the mobile device will open up to allow a “selfie” to be taken of the respective passport holder. According to CBP, group submissions may be made using the Mobile Passport app on one mobile device for all family members of the same household traveling together provided that each family member is a U.S. citizen with a valid U.S. passport or a Canadian citizen with both a valid Canadian passport and B1 or B2 visa status. The Mobile Passport app will not work for U.S. Legal Permanent Residents nor will they be able to process through the designated Mobile Passport lane upon arrival in the United States.

Upon landing or docking in the United States, and instead of filling out a traditional customs declaration paper form, Mobile Passport users may power up their mobile device, turn on Wi-Fi or data, select all of the passport profiles for their traveling party, and complete the New Trip section on the Mobile Passport app. Within a few moments, CBP will review the submission and send the traveler a digital Encrypted Quick Response (QR) code receipt(s), which expires after four hours. This provides travelers enough time between landing or docking and approaching the FIS area where they may access the designated Mobile Passport lanes. Mobile Passport users will be required to show their physical passport(s) and QR code receipt(s), and briefly talk to a CBP officer. 
 
 

Travelers using Mobile Passport may access their mobile devices to use the Mobile Passport app, when processing through the FIS area, but they may not conduct phone calls.
Personal data is encrypted and saved is on the device as a profile and transmitted securely to CBP for review, similar to using an Automated Passport Control kiosk. The Mobile Passport app offers an option to store the user profile on the device or to delete it after the trip. 
Because the Mobile Passport app is used upon entry to the United States, the port of entry is defined as the location where travelers will initially enter the U.S. and undergo screening by CBP. Travelers who would like to use the Mobile Passport app should make sure they are arriving in the U.S. at one of the airports or cruise ports participating with Mobile Passport.

Locations

Airports 
 Baltimore (BWI)
 Boston (BOS)
 Chicago (ORD)
 Dallas/Ft Worth (DFW)
 Denver (DEN)
 Ft. Lauderdale (FLL)
 Honolulu (HNL)
 Houston (HOU and IAH)
 Los Angeles (LAX)
 Miami (MIA)
 Minneapolis (MSP)
 New York (JFK)
 Newark (EWR)
 Oakland (OAK)
 Orlando (MCO)
 Palm Beach (PBI)
 Philadelphia (PHL)
 Phoenix (PHX)
 Pittsburgh (PIT)
 Portland (PDX)
 Raleigh-Durham (RDU)
 Sacramento (SMF)
 San Diego (SAN)
 San Francisco (SFO)
 San Jose (SJC)
 San Juan (SJU)
 Seattle (SEA)
 Tampa (TPA) 
 Washington Dulles (IAD)

Seaports 
 Fort Lauderdale (PEV)
 Miami (MSE)
 San Juan (PUE)
 West Palm Beach (WPB)

See also 
 Global Entry
 Secure Electronic Network for Travelers Rapid Inspection
 NEXUS

References

External links 

Mobile applications
International travel documents
Travel technology
Expedited border crossing schemes